The Commission is second studio album by American rapper Lil' Keke from Houston, Texas. It was released on March 24, 1998 via Jam Down Records/Breakaway Entertainment. It contains 7 songs of his previous studio album, plus 7 new songs. The album peaked at number 176 on the US Billboard 200 chart.

Track listing

Charts

References

External links

1998 albums
Lil' Keke albums